Jürgen Partenheimer (born 14 May 1947, in Munich, Germany) is a German artist. His works span a range of media, from painting, drawing, sculpture, printmaking, artists books, texts and installations. He lives and works in Germany and Italy.

Biography 
Partenheimer was born and raised in Munich, Bavaria. He studied art history and philosophy at Ludwig Maximilian University of Munich from 1968-76 where he received a PhD in art history in 1976. 1971 he received a Columbus scholarship and studied at the Art Department of the University of Arizona, Tucson. He was reinvited as Teaching Assistant to the University of Arizona in 1972 where he graduated with an MFA in 1973. 1976 Partenheimer received a grant from the State of Bavaria for research studies at Musée d´Art Moderne de la Ville de Paris, France. He moved to Düsseldorf in 1978 and was invited by Richard Demarco for his first show at the Richard Demarco Gallery, Edinburgh in 1979. Partenheimer´s work celebrates an exquisite relation of forms and at the same time, they invite association, which is a supremely supple and versatile act of the imagination. In his oeuvre the artist succeeds uniquely in leaving the idea of an objectively experienced world behind, transforming it into a cognitive act of seeing.

Exhibitions 
Partenheimer´s first major exhibition in 1983 was organized by the Kunstraum Munich. Partenheimer has since exhibited his work internationally and was included in the XI Paris Biennial (1980), listed as an American artist at the XVI São Paulo Biennial, Nucleus I (1982) and participated in the XLII Venice Biennial (1986). 1988 The National Galerie Berlin organized Partenheimer´s first extensive museum show in Germany. In 1998 and 1999 the museums for contemporary art IVAM Valencia and the CGAC Santiago de Compostela in Spain organized comprehensive exhibitions of his work. In 2000 he was the first German contemporary artist who was invited to show his work at the National Museum of Art in Beijing and at the Nanjing Museum in Nanjing. Between 2002 and 2008 the S.M.A.K. Ghent, Staatliche Kunsthalle Karlsruhe, Pinacoteca do Estado de São Paulo, IKON Gallery, Birmingham and Kunstmuseum Bonn organized individual shows. 2014 the Pinakothek der Moderne Munich organized a retrospective exhibition with venues at Deichtorhallen, Collection Falckenberg, Hamburg, Kunstmuseum Den Haag and Contemporary Art Gallery, Vancouver. 2015 Musée Ariana in Geneva showed drawings and 21 porcelain vessels which Partenheimer created upon invitation at the Nymphenburg Porcelain Manufacture in Munich. 2017 he had an exhibition at White Cube Gallery, London, Lichtschwarm including paintings, sculptures, unique ceramics and works on paper dating from 1975−2017. 2021 and 2022 Häusler Contemporary Zurich and Max Goelitz Gallery Munich presented recent paintings, drawings, and sculptures.

Recognition
Partenheimer has been the recipient of many awards including the Grand Award for Visual Art, NRW, Düsseldorf (1980), NEA National Endowment for the Arts Award, New York (1982), Canada Council Grant, Montréal (1982), the Spanish Art Critics Award, Madrid (1995), Guest of Honor, German Academy, Villa Massimo, Rome (2003), First Class Order of Merit, Federal Republic of Germany (2004), Nietzsche-Residency Award, Sils-Maria (2006), Nirox Foundation Residency Award, Johannesburg (2011) and Audain Distinguished Residency Award, Emily Carr University for Art+Design, Vancouver(2014).

Further reading
  Bruno Glatt (2019), The event of painting, Häusler Contemporary, Munich, ISBN 978-3-00-063915-9
  Carla Schulz-Hoffmann (2017) On the confluence of feeling and thinking. Snoeck  Publishers, Cologne. ISBN 978-3-86442-205-8
  Petra-Maria Meyer (2014) Relational meaning in the archive of Jürgen Partenheimer. Pinakothek der Moderne, Munich. ISBN 978-3-95476-046-6
  Aoife Mac Namara (2014), The raven diaries, Vancouver, Edition Dittmar, Berlin, ISBN 978-3-9815472-6-9
  Bronwyn Law-Viljoen (2012). Notes made while listening. Onrust, Amsterdam. ISBN 978-90-76135-00-7
  Laymert Garcia dos Santos (2006) Partenheimer and the drawing of drawing. Pinacoteca do Estado, São Paulo. ISBN 3-937572-53-8
  Ivo Mesquita (2004) Conversation with Jürgen Partenheimer. Pinacoteca do Estado, São Paulo. ISBN 85-7448-103-3
  Antje von Graevenitz (2001), The sky supports the earth (axis mundi), Richter Publishers, Düsseldorf, ISBN 3-933807-54-9
  Santiago B. Olmo (1999), Density and lightness- Between rapidity and slowness, IVAM Valencia, ISBN 84-482-1696-2
  Owen Griffith (1998) Tiny Balance. IVAM Centre Julio Gonzalez, Valencia. ISBN 84-482-1696-2
  John Yau (1992), Beyond the Horizon, Barbara Gross Gallery, Munich 
  Hermann Kern (1984) 7 Bank Shot. The acid drawings of Jürgen Partenheimer. Kunstraum Munich. ISBN 3-925047-00-X

Gallery

References

External links 

 Jürgen Partenheimer – official website
 
 Works (artnet)
 Jürgen Partenheimer Artists’ Books
 The viewing rooms of max goelitz offer a deeper insight into the oeuvre of the artists and provide detailed information about artworks. Jürgen Partenheimer Viewing Rooms include il mistero dell'arrivo and Kalliope
 Jürgen Partenheimer | max goelitz, Munich
 Jürgen Partenheimer - Häusler Contemporary, Zürich
 Conversation between Jürgen Partenheimer and Ivo Mesquita, published in "Jürgen Partenheimer. Siave Loucura / Gentle Madness", Pinacoteca do Estado de São Paulo, AR (2005)

20th-century German painters
20th-century German male artists
German male painters
21st-century German painters
21st-century German male artists
Modern painters
1947 births
Living people
Officers Crosses of the Order of Merit of the Federal Republic of Germany